Whipped! is the third album by the American band Faster Pussycat, released in 1992 by Elektra Records.

"Nonstop to Nowhere", for which there is a video, was released as a single and reached  35 on Billboard'''s Mainstream Rock track chart.

The track "Mr. Lovedog" was a tribute to the Mother Love Bone singer Andrew Wood, who had died in 1990.

The tracks "Too Tight" and "Charge Me Up" were recorded during these sessions, but did not make it onto the final album. They were released on the Belted, Buckled and Booted EP.

There are two different versions of the Whipped! album cover; one features a zoomed-out shot of the band running away from a giant dominatrix, whereas the other version is a zoomed-in version of the same picture, so it simply looks like the band members are running across a beach.

The record was not released on vinyl in the United States, but was in Europe and a number of Asian countries, including Korea.

Critical receptionBillboard's'' reviewer prised album diversity and strength of musical material. He singled out "AOR -ready anthem in "Nonstop To Nowhere," an innuendo - ridden teaser in "Big Dictionary," and two strong ballads: "Friends," a touching paean to friendship, and "Mr. Lovedog," a tribute to the late Andrew Wood of Mother Love Bone" and predicted chart entering.

Track listing

Personnel
Faster Pussycat
Taime Downe – lead vocals, backing vocals
Brent Muscat – electric guitar, acoustic guitar, sitar, backing vocals, lead guitar on 5, 8, 10, 12
Greg Steele – electric guitar, acoustic guitar, keyboards, mandolin, backing vocals, co-lead vocals on "Loose Booty", lead guitar on 1–4, 6, 7, 9, 11
Eric Stacy – bass guitar, backing vocals
Brett Bradshaw – drums, percussion, backing vocals
Additional musicians
Jimmy Z – harmonica and flute on "Big Dictionary", saxophone
Art Velasco – trombone
Daniel Fornetro – trumpet
Chuck Kavooras – slide guitar on "Friends"
Nicky Hopkins – piano on "Friends"
Bekka Bramlett – backing vocals
Lisa Reveen – backing vocals
Stephanie Weiss – backing vocals
Pasadena Boys Choir – boys choir on "Mr. Lovedog"

Production
John Jansen – producer, mixing
Ryan Dorn – engineer
Tom Hardisty – assistant engineer
Brian Virtue – assistant engineer
Nelson Ayres – assistant engineer
Greg Calbi – mastering
Eric Troyer – additional background vocals, arrangements
Nick Egan – art direction
Eric Roinestad – design
Markus Morianz – photography
Mique Willmott – logo and illustrations

Charts

References

Faster Pussycat albums
1992 albums
Elektra Records albums